The Diocese of Banská Bystrica is a Roman Catholic diocese in central Slovakia. Its seat is in Banská Bystrica. On Tuesday 20 November 2012, according to biographical information in a press release from the Holy See Press Office's Vatican Information Service (VIS), Pope Benedict XVI appointed Auxiliary Bishop Marián Chovanec of the Roman Catholic Diocese of Nitra (based in Nitra, Slovakia), Titular Bishop of Massita, as Bishop-elect of the Roman Catholic Diocese of Banská Bystrica. Bishop Chovanec was born on 16 September 1957 in Trenčin, Slovakia, a part of the Diocese of Nitra. He was expelled from the Seminary in Bratislava, Slovakia, because he had refused to cooperate with the Government-backed Association "Pacem in Terris" (Peace on Earth). He then worked as a laborer. After seven years, he was able to conclude his theological studies and be ordained a priest in 1989; he became an Auxiliary Bishop of Nitra in 1999 and Vicar General in 2003 and is active in the Slovak Bishops' Conference.

History
The diocese was established on 13 March 1776 as a suffragan of the Archdiocese of Esztergom. On 30 December 1977, it was taken from the former and became part of the newly created Slovak ecclesiastical province with metropolitan being the Diocese of Trnava, which was renamed on 31 March 1995 to the Archdiocese of Bratislava-Trnava. It covers western and central parts of the Banská Bystrica Region, eastern parts of the Trenčín Region and southern central parts of the Žilina Region. It covered an area of 5,424 km² with 590,494 people of which 62% were of Catholic faith (2006).

On 14 February 2008, as a part of the changes in Slovak dioceses, the diocese lost area around Martin to the newly created Diocese of Žilina and territory around Brezno to Diocese of Rožňava. On the other hand, it gained former eastern areas of the Archdiocese of Bratislava-Trnava (from Banská Štiavnica to Šahy and Veľký Krtíš) (see e.g. this map (in Slovak), and some other border changes occurred as well.

Jozef Feranec held the title from 1973 until 1990.

Bishops

Churches
Church of Saint Matthew of Zolná

References

External links
  
 
 

Banská Bystrica
Roman Catholic dioceses in Slovakia